The 1992 Republican National Convention was held in the Astrodome in Houston, Texas, from August 17 to August 20, 1992. The convention nominated President George H. W. Bush and Vice President Dan Quayle for reelection. It was Bush's fourth consecutive appearance as a candidate on a major party ticket; only Bush and Franklin D. Roosevelt have been nominated on four consecutive presidential tickets. Richard Nixon and Roosevelt were nominated five times, but not consecutively.

Site selection
The two finalist cities that Houston had defeated to land the convention were New Orleans, Louisiana and San Diego, California. While Houston was the adopted hometown of the incumbent Republican president George H. W. Bush, when the location was announced, the party insisted that Bush had not used his influence to land the city the convention, and had only instructed the party to choose "the best site" for the convention. Unsuccessful finalist city New Orleans had been the location of the previous Republican National Convention in 1988.

Bids

Venue logistics
The Astrodome had been renovated recently before its selection as the convention's location. For the convention, the stadium was arranged to seat 36,000 people.

To accommodate the convention and its set-up, the Houston Astros, the Major League Baseball team which played at the Astrodome, played 26 consecutive away games over 28 days, the longest Major League Baseball "road trip" since the Philadelphia Phillies played 27 away games in 28 days in 1944. Additionally, the National Football League's Houston Oilers would also be forced to play all their preseason games on the road. The Major League Baseball Players Association had filed an unsuccessful grievance in October 1991 in an attempt to block the planned 26-game road trip by the Astros. The Major League Baseball Players Association took issue with the Houston Sports Association (owners of the Astrodome) renting the stadium to the Republican National Convention organizers from July 27 through August 23, 1992 without first seeking permission from the National League, and their grievance sought to shorten the length of the road trip, arguing that the 26-game road trip went against the National League's constitution.

Overview
The convention is notable in that it featured the last major address of the long political career of former President Ronald Reagan, Bush's predecessor. In his speech, Reagan told Americans that:

Whatever else history may say about me when I'm gone, I hope it will record that I appealed to your best hopes, not your worst fears, to your confidence rather than your doubts. My dream is that you will travel the road ahead with liberty's lamp guiding your steps and opportunity's arm steadying your way. My fondest hope for each one of you—and especially for the young people here—is that you will love your country, not for her power or wealth, but for her selflessness and her idealism. May each of you have the heart to conceive, the understanding to direct, and the hand to execute works that will make the world a little better for your having been here.

As the economy was in a recession and domestic affairs in general had dramatically decayed, the GOP lagged in the polls by double digits behind the Bill Clinton–Al Gore Democratic ticket after a successful Democratic Convention, and with Ross Perot temporarily out of the race, the Republican Party worked hard to rally its base of social conservatives. Pat Buchanan's opening night "Culture War" speech argued that a great battle of values was taking place in the United States. Republican National Committee chairman Rich Bond (referring to Democrats) claimed that "we are America, they are not America." Marilyn Quayle dismissed Bill Clinton's claim to a new generation of leadership by saying, "Not everyone demonstrated, dropped out, took drugs, joined in the sexual revolution or dodged the draft." Regarding Buchanan's speech, liberal humorist Molly Ivins quipped that it "probably sounded better in the original German." Twenty years after the convention, the New York Times wrote, "Supporters of Mr. Bush pointed to the tone of the convention as one of the reasons he lost re-election that November to Bill Clinton," as it centered more on Reagan-era values and Bush's international credentials at a time that the main issue was the domestic crisis. Despite the fact that the now-infamous "No new taxes" pledge had haunted the President for the last three years, the economy was barely mentioned.

AIDS activist Mary Fisher, who has HIV, addressed the convention, making an eloquent plea for her cause. (She also addressed the 1996 RNC). Her 1992 speech was listed as #50 in American Rhetoric's Top 100 Speeches of the 20th Century (listed by rank).

During his acceptance speech, President Bush thanked former President Richard Nixon for his advice and contributions to the administration's foreign policy. This would be Nixon's last RNC, as he died in 1994.

Restaurateur Ninfa Laurenzo delivered the Pledge of Allegiance at the opening session on August 17, 1992.

Secretary of Labor Lynn Martin delivered the nomination speech of President Bush for re-election. The nomination was seconded by J. C. Watts.

The stadium banned outside food from the convention, but set up a food court in the nearby Astroarena. The food court operations included Atchafalaya River Cafe, Bambolino's, Frenchy's, Luther's Bar-B-Q, Ninfa's, PeaColes, and Tommy's Burgers. Some restaurant owners had connections with the Houston Host Committee, the group in charge of the vendor market of the Astroarena, and Republican Party officials. The hot dogs and soft drinks sold by the Astrodome's official caterer, Harry M. Stevens, were not present during the convention. Vendors at the convention paid Stevens a fee so they could sell food at the convention, as specified in Stevens' contract with the Astrodome.

Presidential nomination roll call vote
 George H. W. Bush 2,166
 Patrick J. Buchanan 18
 Alan Keyes 1

Vice presidential nomination vote
 Dan Quayle was renominated by voice vote.

Aftermath
The convention energized the Republican base, giving the Bush-Quayle ticket a bounce in the polls. As the bounce faded, the race returned to a lopsided double-digit Clinton–Gore lead. The race narrowed considerably, however, when Ross Perot rebooted his insurgent campaign.

The major parties have avoided hosting their conventions at baseball stadiums since then, now holding them in non sports venues (such as convention centers) and venues for teams whose seasons are not currently in play at the time of the convention.

See also

1992 Republican Party presidential primaries
George H. W. Bush 1992 presidential campaign
History of the United States Republican Party
List of Republican National Conventions
U.S. presidential nomination convention
1991 Libertarian National Convention
1992 Democratic National Convention
1992 United States presidential election

References

External links
 George Bush's nomination acceptance speech for President at RNC (video) at C-SPAN
 George Bush's nomination acceptance speech for President at RNC (text) at The American Presidency Project
 George Bush's nomination acceptance speech for President at RNC (audio) 
 Video of Quayle nomination acceptance speech for Vice President at RNC (via YouTube)
 Audio of Quayle nomination acceptance speech for Vice President at RNC
 Transcript of Quayle nomination acceptance speech for Vice President at RNC 
 Republican Party platform of 1992 at The American Presidency Project
 Ronald Reagan's Address to the 1992 Republican National Convention (video) (text)
Patrick Buchanan's Address to the 1992 RNC, the "Culture War" speech. Text, audio and video.
Mary Fisher's A Whisper of AIDS Speech to the 1992 Republican National Convention Text, audio and video.
 Video (with audio) of Phil Gramm's Keynote Address at Republican National Convention
 Text of Phil Gramm's Keynote Address at Republican National Convention

Republican National Conventions
1992 United States presidential election
1992 in Houston
1992 in Texas
Articles containing video clips
Republican Party (United States) events in Texas
1992 conferences
Political conventions in Texas
August 1992 events in the United States
Conventions in Houston